Pavlos Mavroudis (born 12 January 2001) is a Greek professional footballer who plays as a midfielder for Super League 2 club Olympiacos B.

References

2001 births
Living people
Greek footballers
Super League Greece 2 players
Olympiacos F.C. players
Association football midfielders
Footballers from Thessaloniki
Olympiacos F.C. B players
Greek expatriate sportspeople in Germany
Panathinaikos F.C. players
TSV 1860 Munich players